Abdullah Kili is a town in the Federally Administered Tribal Areas of Pakistan. It is located at 33°49'45N 70°4'1E with an altitude of 1449 metres (4757 feet).

References

Populated places in Khyber Pakhtunkhwa